Auguste Lepoutre (28 May 1825 - 5 December 1903) was a French politician. He served as a member of the Chamber of Deputies from 1885 to 1889, representing Nord.

References

1825 births
1903 deaths
Politicians from Lille
Members of the 4th Chamber of Deputies of the French Third Republic